Vladyslav Anatoliyovich Kryvobokov was a candidate in the 2004 Ukrainian presidential election, nominated by the People's Party of Depositors and Social Protection, which he has chaired since its foundation in 2000. In 1997, he created and chaired a public organization "For social protection of population", that aims to ensure social and rights protection of population. Since then, he has been constantly involved into public and political activities. On 9 January 1999 there was an assassination attempt on him – a hired killer fired at point-blank range at his car. Krivobokov received 10 bullet wounds, but survived. His election program features total privatisation, an amnesty for the population's debts, starting from utility debts to tax debts.

References

Year of birth missing (living people)
Living people
Candidates in the 2004 Ukrainian presidential election